Gran Estación shopping mall is located in the Ciudad Salitre in Bogotá, Colombia. It opened its doors on December 1, 2006. The mall is the fourth biggest mall in Colombia  and is also one of the biggest in South America.

It is located less than 10 minutes from Eldorado International Airport. The mall contains 374 shops, 2,079 parking spaces for cars (69 for disabled), free wi-fi, arcade, bowling, casino, theatre with eight screens movie theatre 3D & 2D. It has the first Starbucks opened inside a mall in Colombia.

The mall consists of two buildings - El Costado Esfera and El Costado Alfiles that are connected by metallic bridge.

Anchor Stores and Restaurants 
Some of the most important stores within the mall are Almacenes Éxito, Cine Colombia, and Pepe Ganga. 

Among the most important restaurants, these are: Crepes & Waffles, El Corral, McDonalds, and KFC

References

http://www.geimpresionante.com/sitio/index.php?option=com_content&task=view&id=20&Itemid=48
http://www.geimpresionante.com/sitio/index.php?option=com_content&task=view&id=33&Itemid=63
http://www.geimpresionante.com/sitio/index.php
http://www.geimpresionante.com/sitio/index.php?option=com_content&task=view&id=29&Itemid=58

Shopping malls in Bogotá